Gary Whetter (born 6 September 1963) is an English former footballer who played as a striker in the Football League for Darlington. He also played non-league football for Crook Town, Billingham Synthonia, for whom he scored 6 goals from 18 appearances in all competitions, and Whitby Town.

References

1963 births
Living people
Footballers from Middlesbrough
English footballers
Association football midfielders
Crook Town A.F.C. players
Darlington F.C. players
Billingham Synthonia F.C. players
Whitby Town F.C. players
English Football League players
Northern Football League players